The Bicton Arena International 5*, known for sponsorship reasons as the Chedington Bicton Park 5* Horse Trials was a CCI 5* eventing competition held as a one-off replacement for the Burghley Horse Trials in 2021, following the cancellation of both UK 5* events in 2020 and 2021 due to the coronavirus pandemic. The event was won by Gemma Tattersall riding Chilli Knight.

Location and design
The event was held at Bicton Arena, an established equestrian venue which already hosts a 4* competition, located on Clinton Devon Estates land at Bicton House, Devon, England.

The arena already hosts a CCI 4* event over very challenging undulating terrain, and the 5* course was designed by Captain Mark Phillips, a former Olympic gold medallist in eventing.

The cross-country course proved challenging with 12 riders retiring or being eliminated during the cross-country phase - over one third of all competitors.

Only two riders completed the cross-country phase clear inside the time allowed, with Oliver Townend also being inside the time, but with 11 jumping penalties.

Participation
32 riders took part in the event, with 18 completing the event.

Countries represented were:
  Great Britain – Gemma Tattersall, Pippa Funnell, Piggy March, Rosalind Canter, Richard P Jones, Oliver Townend, Felicity Collins, Francis Whittington, Angus Smales, Louisa Lockwood, Harry Mutch, Will Rawlin, Izzy Taylor, William Fox-Pitt, Simon Grieve, Georgie Spence, David Doel, Richard Skelt, Michael Owen
  Ireland – Padraig McCarthy, Joseph Murphy, Sarah Dowley
  New Zealand – Tim Price, James Avery
  Australia – Sammi Birch, Sam Griffiths
  Canada – Michael Winter
  Sweden – Malin Josefsson

Results
The results were:

References

External links
Official site

Eventing
Equestrian sports in the United Kingdom
Equestrian sports in England